You Give Love a Bad Name is the fourth studio album released by American punk rock musician GG Allin, recorded with his backing band the Holy Men. Reissues credit the release mistakenly to GG Allin and the Criminal Quartet.

The album was the first to fully mark a distinct change in his vocal tone, which by this time began to take on a slurred and gravelly characteristic, and increasing usage of shock rock lyrical content.

History
After the release of the Hated in the Nation compilation cassette by ROIR, as well as a series of letters written by Allin to such magazines as Maximum RockNRoll and Flipside, and advertising campaigns in many music magazines and fanzines like Option, Flipside, RIP, Ben is Dead and many others by Black & Blue Records, Allin's stature in the punk rock underground had grown considerably. However, Allin's uncompromising, and increasingly transgressive performances, and his tendency towards extremely lowbrow lyrics, made him an unlikely prospect not only for major labels, but also for many of the independent labels like SST, Touch and Go, and Alternative Tentacles. Allin had parted with his previous label, Black and Blue Records once he signed with Homestead Records with Yarmouth's blessings.The goal was to get GG on a major label and both GG and Yarmouth felt Homestead was a good first step in getting there versus the small RI based label. Yarmouth is quoted "GG loved to trash any perceived or real authority including his record labels. I recall one show at The Populous Pudding in CT after the release of his second Homestead release where backstage GG pissed on my leg and yelled proudly that he now had pissed on both his labels. He said he pissed on Cosley's head. GG was that kind of guy. Back in the early days I spent a lot of money advertising GG in music publications.  No label after Black & Blue had to sell an unknown artist."

Enter Gerard Cosloy, who had already played rhythm guitar with Allin on the "new" recordings on Hated in the Nation. Cosloy operated Homestead Records through a deal with record distributor Dutch East India, and had released records by Big Black, Sonic Youth and Dinosaur Jr before those bands left for greener pastures. With room on the roster and a desire to work with Allin again, Cosloy courted the shock-rocker. Allin agreed almost immediately. Homestead would be the biggest label Allin would deal with up until this time.

Music
On May 18, 1987, Allin entered a low-budget studio called The Music Box, located on Avenue B in New York City's East Village, accompanied by a four-piece band that included Cosloy on second guitar, along with three other area musicians: lead guitarist Greg Bullock, bassist Mike Kirkland, and drummer Mike "Machine Gun" Edison. Allin dubbed the session band The Holy Men.

Musically, Allin eschewed the hyper hardcore punk tempos of his second studio album Eat My Fuc in favor of the rough mid-tempo rock he began on his third full length, 1985's self-released cassette You'll Never Tame Me which is reminiscent of the New York Dolls and the Rolling Stones (the latter of which Allin was a major fan).

"Tough Fuckin' Shit" is an uncredited rewrite of Nancy Sinatra's "Sorry 'Bout That". And "I'm a Rapist" (sic)is musically the track "Blood for You" but with new lyrics (both originally appeared on 1986's self-released cassette EP The Sleaziest, Loosest Sluts by GG Allin & The Cedar Street Sluts.

"Beer Picnic" is a faithful, if slower, version of a song by obscure NYC punk band Bad Tuna Experience. (G.G. asked for—but did not receive—permission to record the song; he bought a cassette tape from Bad Tuna members after reading the lyrics, written by Bad Tuna's Carolyn and No Thanks' Donna Damage, in Maximum RockNRoll sometime in the mid-1980s.) The other cover version, "Garbage Dump", was written and originally recorded by Charles Manson on his infamous Lie album.

While most of the song titles are self-explanatory, "Suck Dog" is reportedly about writer and performance artist Lisa Crystal Carver.

Recording tales
During the sessions, recording engineer Jaques Kralian reportedly asked Allin (who co-engineered the recording) and Cosloy if they really were serious about releasing the sessions. His question was answered a few months later when Allin and Cosloy immortalized his inquiry - "You guys aren't planning on pressing this into a record, are you?" - on the back cover of the album.

All ten of the songs were rehearsed and recorded in one day-long session. Cosloy produced but did not take production credit, instead claiming on the liner notes that he "re-mixed, unmixed, and edited" the album as heard in its final form.

Bonus tracks
In 1992, while Allin was serving a prison sentence for parole violation in Jackson, Michigan, Awareness Records reissued You Give Love a Bad Name, adding the Watch Me Kill 7" EP recorded on July 7, 1991 in Lowell, MA by Allin, with himself and then-collaborator Mark Sheehan (of the MA band Out Cold) playing all of the instruments, plus an interview conducted over the phone from prison on March 4, 1991 with journalist Jeff Koch.

Track listing

Original 1987 LP
All songs written by G.G. Allin except where noted.

Side one
"Swank Fuckin'" (G.G. Allin, Mike Edison) - 2:53
"Bloody Mary's Bloody Cunt" (G.G. Allin, Mike Edison) - 3:26
"Tough Fuckin' Shit" - 2:08
"I'm a Rapest" - 4:27
"Suck Dog" (G.G. Allin, Greg Bullock) - 2:50

Side two
"Teenage Twats" (G.G. Allin, Gerald Cosloy) - 3:29
"Beer Picnic" (Bad Tuna Experience) - 4:22
"Stink Finger Clit" (G.G. Allin, Gerald Cosloy) - 3:04
"Scars on My Body - Scabs on My Dick" (G.G. Allin, Bloody F. Mess, Gerald Cosloy) - 2:30
"Garbage Dump" (Charles Manson) - 2:23

CD reissue bonus tracks
"Watch Me Kill the Boston Girl" - 1:00
"Castration Crucifixion" - 2:06
"Snakeman's Dance" - 3:04
"Slaughterhouse Deathcamp" - 1:15
"Feces and Blood" - 3:41
"Master Daddy" - 1:45
"Interview from Prison" - 15:58

Personnel
 GG Allin - vocals, engineer, voices, producer
 Gerard Cosloy	- guitar, editing, backing vocals, remixing, sequencing, mixing
 Mike Kirkland	- bass
 Greg Van Voorst - percussion, backing vocals
 Greg Bullock - guitar, backing vocals
 Mike "Machine Gun" Edison - drums, backing vocals
 Jaques Kralian - engineer
 Wharton Tiers	- sequencing
 Bloody F. Mess - liner notes
 Georgia Hubley - cover layout

References

1987 albums
Awareness Records albums
Homestead Records albums
GG Allin albums